Mercedes-Benz has sold a number of automobiles with the "380" model name:
1933 380
 1981–1985 R107
 1981 380SLC
 1981–1985 380SL
 1981–1985 W126
 1981–1983 380SEL
 1982–1983 380SEC
 1984–1985 380SE

380